2nd Avenue & Abilene station (sometimes stylized as 2nd Ave•Abilene) is a Regional Transportation District (RTD) light rail station on the R Line in Aurora, Colorado. The station is located along Interstate 225 at 2nd Avenue and has a 242-stall park-and-ride lot.

The station opened on February 24, 2017, along with the rest of the R Line.

References

RTD light rail stations
Transportation buildings and structures in Aurora, Colorado
Railway stations in the United States opened in 2017
2017 establishments in Colorado